Guido John Grilli (born January 9, 1939) is an American former professional baseball pitcher. A left-hander, he appeared in Major League Baseball for the Boston Red Sox and Kansas City Athletics during the 1966 season. Grilli was born in Memphis, Tennessee, where he attended the University of Memphis.

Grilli signed with the Red Sox in 1959 and spent seven seasons working his way through their farm system. In 1965, a stellar season as a relief pitcher for the Toronto Maple Leafs, champions of the Triple-A International League, earned him a spot on Boston's 40-man winter roster. He started  with the Red Sox, making his MLB debut on Opening Day (he issued a base on balls to the only hitter he faced, Curt Blefary of the Baltimore Orioles). But he struggled in six appearances and was sent back to Toronto during the May roster cutdown. Then, on June 13, Boston recalled Grilli and shipped him to the Athletics in a six-player trade that yielded relief pitcher John Wyatt and outfielder José Tartabull. 

Grilli then worked in 16 games for Kansas City. Through June 29 and his first eight games pitched, his earned run average was a sparkling 1.42. But he was treated roughly three times in his next eight appearances—twice by the Orioles, en route to their 1966 World Series championship—and by July 16, his ERA in an Athletics' uniform had deteriorated to 6.89. He was sent to Triple-A Vancouver, and left baseball after that season.

In his 22-game MLB career, all in relief, Grilli posted a 0–2 won–lost record with a 7.08 ERA and one save in 20 innings of work. He gave up 24 hits and 20 bases on balls, with 12 strikeouts. His lone save came July 3 against the Detroit Tigers, when he preserved a 10–4 Kansas City triumph.

References

External links
Baseball Reference

1939 births
Living people
Allentown Red Sox players
Alpine Cowboys players
American people of Italian descent
Baseball players from Memphis, Tennessee
Boston Red Sox players
Corning Red Sox players
Johnstown Red Sox players
Kansas City Athletics players
Major League Baseball pitchers
Memphis Tigers baseball players
Raleigh Capitals players
Reading Red Sox players
Seattle Rainiers players
Toronto Maple Leafs (International League) players
Vancouver Mounties players
York White Roses players